Arthur William Kellaway (21 November 1881 – 27 August 1949), known as Arthur Chesney, was an English character actor who worked on stage and screen.

Biography
He was born 21 November 1881 in Hampstead, London, the son of John and Catherine Kellaway (née Oliver). He was the brother of the actor Edmund Gwenn and the cousin of the actor Cecil Kellaway. He married actress Estelle Winwood in 1907 but their marriage was dissolved and she remarried in 1928. He later married Kitty Ridge, and they had daughter Ann Dummett in 1930. Ann went on to become a racial justice activist.

Chesney made his first stage appearance in 1903, in a play at County Theatre in  Bedford. For many years he took part in many plays in London and New York. He died in a hospital on 27 August 1949 following a massive stroke in Hampstead, aged 67.

Filmography

References

External links

1881 births
1949 deaths
Male actors from London
English male film actors
English male silent film actors
20th-century English male actors